Burgundia (minor planet designation: 374 Burgundia) is a typical main belt asteroid that was discovered by Auguste Charlois on 18 September 1893 in Nice. It was named for the former French region of Burgundy. It is one of seven of Charlois's discoveries that was expressly named by the Astromomisches Rechen-Institut (Astronomical Calculation Institute).

Burgundia was long thought to be a member of the now defunct Ceres asteroid family, but it was found to be an unrelated interloper in that group based on its non-matching composition.

References

External links
 
 

Background asteroids
Burgundia
Burgundia
S-type asteroids (Tholen)
S-type asteroids (SMASS)
18930918